Highway Patrol is an Australian factual television series screened on the Seven Network, which premiered on 21 September 2009. Highway Patrol follows members of the Victoria Police highway patrol (formerly the Traffic Management Unit) as they intercept traffic and other criminal offenders on roads in Victoria, Australia.

Synopsis 
The program follows police involved in attending major road accidents, high-speed police chases, confronting drunk drivers as well as issuing lesser penalty notices to drivers for a variety of traffic offences.

Each episode follows the progress of a select few incidents involving various officers, from the first encounter by the officers through to the officers leaving the scene, with the exception that occasionally the officers will escort a driver back to a police station for the purpose of a breath or blood sample. Fines, court convictions and demerit points issued in relation to each incident are shown in a voiced-over addendum at the end.

Highway Patrol is produced by Greenstone TV, makers of New Zealand's Motorway Patrol with the co-operation of Victoria Police, and airs in Australia on the Seven Network. Domestically, repeated episodes air on sister channels 7two and 7mate as well as syndicated on subscription television channel FOX8.

Internationally, the program is screened in New Zealand on TV2, Denmark on Canal 9, Norway on Canal 9 and the United Kingdom on ITV4 and Pick.

Production
The first season of Highway Patrol went to air in September 2009. A second season was announced by Channel Seven on 18 November 2009 which premiered 2 February 2010. A seventh season of Highway Patrol was announced on the show's official website on 13 July 2014. On 9 December 2014, Victoria Police announced on their official Facebook page that season eight had started filming and would air sometime in 2016. On 15 December 2014, series producer Mary Durham announced that season 7 would consist of 10 episodes and would air sometime in 2015.

In October 2015, Greenstone TV confirmed that season 8 was in post production. In March 2016, it was announced that season 9 had started filming to air in 2017. In July 2018, Channel 7 released their first promotion for season 10 to begin airing from Wednesday 1 August 2018.

In November 2019, Greenstone TV announced that the final two episodes of series 11 will most likely air in 2020 and filming for the 12th season will start filming mid year. On 18 November Greenstone TV also launched an official Highway Patrol Facebook.

Episodes

References

External links
Seven Network Official Site
 Greenstone TV
 Victoria Police

Australian factual television series
Seven Network original programming
2009 Australian television series debuts
2010s Australian television series
Documentary television series about policing
English-language television shows
Television series by Greenstone TV
Television series by Beyond Television Productions